Notoplax websteri is a very rare species of chiton in the family Acanthochitonidae.

References
 Powell A. W. B., New Zealand Mollusca, William Collins Publishers Ltd, Auckland, New Zealand 1979 

websteri
Chitons of New Zealand
Chitons described in 1835